William D. Kearfott (January 12, 1864 – November 12, 1917) was an American engineer and amateur entomologist. Kearfott was educated in primary schools in Richmond and Philadelphia and was connected with the Morton Poole Company and the International Navigation Company in his early career. Kearfott was also associated with the Worthington Steam Pump Company and was considered an authority on his branch of engineering.

Kearfott also worked on Lepidoptera, especially Tortricidae, and built up a large collection.

Kearfott had a peculiar approach to naming new species, using a very orderly, alphabetical fashion, resulting in specific names such as bobana, cocana, dodana, etc. Because Kearfott's names were published in widely distributed scientific journals and his species were adequately described and diagnosed, his names are valid. However, his naming practices were not deemed appropriate by other entomologists; Edward Meyrick even responded to Kearfott's work with a paper called "On some impossible specific names in Micro-Lepidoptera", published in 1912. In this paper, Meyrick described Kearfott's names as "openly and obviously based on a barbarous and unmeaning gibberish". Meyrick rejected Kearfott's names and proposed new "appropriate" Latin names to replace them. Because the names are valid however, this led to the creation of many synonyms.

His collection of Tortricidae is now in the American Museum of Natural History, while his collection of Pyralidae went to the William Barnes collection, which is now at the Smithsonian.

References

American entomologists
1864 births
1917 deaths
People from Berkeley County, West Virginia